Marie Harmon (October 21, 1923 – January 25, 2021) was an American actress and businesswoman, who worked as an actress primarily in the 1940s during the Golden Age of Hollywood. She is best known for her lead role in the 1946 American Western film The El Paso Kid, opposite Sunset Carson.

Early life and career
Harmon was born on October 21, 1923, in Chicago, Illinois, United States. She had five siblings, all brothers. As a child, she performed in local theater productions. At age 18, she moved to Hollywood, California, to pursue a professional career in acting. Her acting debut was an uncredited role in the 1943 film Hers to Hold, starring Deanna Durbin and Joseph Cotten.

Personal life
Harmon was married three times. Her first husband was William G. Jones. Their only child is actress Sondra Currie. They divorced in 1948. She married Donald Currie in 1951. She quit show business to open up a female clothing store. The couple had three children; twin daughters Cherie Currie (former lead vocalist of The Runaways), and Marie Currie, and a son Don Anthony Currie. She was the mother-in-law of Alan J. Levi, and formerly of Steven Lukather (guitarist of Toto) and Robert Hays. Harmon got divorced in 1972. Three years later, she married Wolfgang Kaupisch, a German Iron Cross recipient, and Veteran of the Luftwaffe, who died in on June 9, 2010, at the age of 95. She died in Los Angeles on January 25, 2021, of natural causes at the age of 97.

Filmography

References

External links

1923 births
2021 deaths
American film actresses
Actresses from Illinois
Actresses from Chicago
21st-century American women